Blood Fever is the second novel in the Young Bond book series by Charlie Higson

Blood Fever may also refer to:

 Bloodfever, the second novel in the Darkfever book series
 "Blood Fever" (Star Trek: Voyager), an episode of Star Trek: Voyager
 Blood Fever, a working title for the 1995 film Mosquito
 (archaic) May refer to sepsis.